The 2021–22 Richmond Spiders women's basketball team represented the University of Richmond during the 2021–22 NCAA Division I women's basketball season. The Spiders, led by third-year head coach Aaron Roussell, played their home games at the Robins Center and were members of the Atlantic 10 Conference.

Previous season
The Spiders finished the 2020–21 season with a record of 13–9, 9–6 in A-10 play to finish in sixth place. In the A-10 women's tournament, they defeated No. 11 seed George Washington in the second round before falling to No. 3 seed Saint Louis in the quarterfinals, with both games requiring overtime.

Roster

Schedule
Richmond's 2021–22 non-conference schedule featured 13 games, including a pair of games in the Cavalier Classic in Charlottesville, Virginia, and another pair in the FAU Pre-Christmas Tournament in Boca Raton, Florida.

In the Atlantic 10 portion of the schedule, Richmond played a total of 16 games, including home and away games against VCU, Duquesne, and La Salle. In addition, Richmond hosted Massachusetts, Dayton, Davidson, Rhode Island and Fordham, while the Spiders traveled to George Washington, Saint Joseph's, George Mason, Saint Louis, and St. Bonaventure.

The Spiders finished in eighth place in Atlantic 10 play and faced No. 9 seed Davidson in the second round of the A-10 women's tournament, falling by a score of 66–62.

|-
!colspan=9 style=| Non-conference regular season

|-
!colspan=9 style=| Atlantic 10 regular season

|-
!colspan=9 style=| Atlantic 10 Tournament

Source:

References

Richmond Spiders women's basketball seasons
Richmond